Emmanuel Laurent Petit (born 22 September 1970) is a French former professional footballer who played as a defensive midfielder at club level for Arsenal, Barcelona, Monaco, and Chelsea. He represented France at international level in two FIFA World Cups and two UEFA European Championships; he scored the third goal in France's 3–0 victory in the 1998 FIFA World Cup Final and was also a member of the French squad that won UEFA Euro 2000.

Early life
Petit was born in Dieppe, Seine-Maritime.

Club career

Petit began his career at minor club ES Arques-la-Bataille before being signed by Arsène Wenger's Monaco side at the age of 18. He made his debut soon after and played in the 1989 Coupe de France final. Petit became a regular at Monaco, playing as a left-sided or central midfielder. In 1991, he won the Coupe de France with Monaco and also played in the 1992 European Cup Winners' Cup final (which Monaco lost to Werder Bremen). In 1996–97, his final season at Monaco, he captained his side to the Ligue 1 title.

Petit joined Arsenal in June 1997 for £2.5 million, where he was reunited with his former Monaco manager Arsène Wenger. Wenger switched Petit from central midfielder to defensive midfielder, and partnered him with fellow Frenchman Patrick Vieira. The French duo formed a midfield partnership which brought instant success, as Petit won the double with Arsenal in his very first season, clinching both the Premier League title and the FA Cup. Altogether, in the three seasons in his Arsenal career, Petit made 118 appearances and scored 11 goals, including a stunning drive from outside the area against Derby County (which was also the winning goal), during the 1997–98 season.

Petit moved to Barcelona (together with Arsenal teammate Marc Overmars) in the summer of 2000 for £7 million (€14 million). At Barcelona, he was moved back into defence and suffered a rash of niggling injuries. As a result, he failed to settle and could not hold down a regular place. In his biography, published in 2008, the midfielder gave his time at Barcelona a special chapter in which he exposed that coach Lorenzo Serra Ferrer did not even know what position he played when he joined the team. His only goal for Barcelona came on 13 May 2001 at home to Rayo Vallecano in a 5–1 win.

After his first season at the Camp Nou, Petit was linked with moves back to England with Manchester United, Tottenham and Chelsea, joining the last in 2001 in a £7.5 million transfer deal. He initially was a first-team regular for the Blues in a largely disappointing first season and played in the 2002 FA Cup final which Chelsea lost to his old club, Arsenal. He scored his first goal for Chelsea in a 2–1 win over Derby on 30 March 2002. His second season saw a significant improvement, as he formed an impressive midfield partnership with Frank Lampard as Chelsea impressed in the winner-takes-all final game of the season against Liverpool as Chelsea secured the fourth UEFA Champions League berth. He also scored twice throughout the season: against Everton in the League Cup, and former club Arsenal in the league. After a series of knee injuries, however, he spent much of his final season of his career on the sidelines, and he was released on a free transfer in the summer of 2004, his final appearance for the club coming against Blackburn Rovers on 1 February 2004.

After being released by Chelsea, Petit rejected the chance to sign for Bolton Wanderers, and he announced his retirement on 20 January 2005 after failing to fully recover following knee surgery.

International career
Playing for the France national team, Petit earned 63 caps and scored six international goals in his career and won the 1998 FIFA World Cup and UEFA Euro 2000. He scored twice in the 1998 World Cup, the first from a powerful shot from just outside the box against Denmark, which turned out to be the match winner, and a second in the final against Brazil. The goal he scored in the final was particularly memorable, as he had embarked on an optimistic run across field before calmly slotting in the goal in the final minute of regular time. That same goal happened to be the 1,000th goal in the history of the French Football Federation, and the last World Cup goal of the 20th century. France won the match 3–0. An earlier Petit corner kick had set up Zinedine Zidane's header for France's first goal. Petit was also part of the 2002 World Cup squad, though France failed to advance past the group stages and failed to score a single goal in three matches during their defence of the trophy.

Petit retired from international football in September 2003.

Style of play
Although capable of playing as a defender, Petit usually played as a defensive midfielder throughout his career, and was known for his energy, work-rate, strength, tackling, aerial prowess, and positional intelligence in this position, as well as his elegance, and his passing range and striking ability from distance with his left foot; as such, he was not only capable of breaking up attacks, but of dictating play in midfield, creating chances for teammates, and even scoring goals.

Personal life
Petit married French actress Agathe de La Fontaine, in 2000, but they divorced in 2002 after having one child, Zoe. He now shares his life with Maria Servello, with whom he had another child, Violet, in 2007. He has often appeared on French TV as a football analyst.
His brother Olivier was an amateur footballer when Petit was a teenager. While playing for his club Arques in 1988, Olivier collapsed and was rushed to hospital where he was pronounced dead due to a blood clot of the brain. In his biography, Petit explained that this event shocked him to such an extent that it almost made him quit football. He viewed his brother as a gifted young man who had good looks and did well in all his endeavours, whether it was football or education. At age 18, he was already facing the demanding rigors of the Monaco youth academy, and not so soon, he had lost his grandfather. His brother’s and grandfather’s loss happened in a bracket of two years and the passing of his brother almost became the final straw.

He starred as himself in a Christmas special episode of British police show The Bill in 1998.

Petit has been an ambassador for the Homeless World Cup movement since the tournament was hosted by Paris in 2011.

Petit was added in EA Sports FIFA 16 as an ultimate team legend.

Career statistics

Club

International

Scores and results list France's goal tally first, score column indicates score after each Petit goal.

Honours
Monaco
Division 1: 1996–97
Coupe de France: 1990–91

Arsenal
Premier League: 1997–98
FA Cup: 1997–98
FA Charity Shield: 1998, 1999

France
FIFA World Cup: 1998
UEFA European Championship: 2000

Individual
Division 1 Rookie of the Year: 1990
Premier League Player of the Month: April 1998
Onze de Bronze: 1998
PFA Premier League Team of the Year: 1998–99

Orders
Knight of the Legion of Honour: 1998

References

External links

 
 Homeless World Cup Ambassador Profile
 
 

Living people
1970 births
Sportspeople from Dieppe, Seine-Maritime
Association football midfielders
1998 FIFA World Cup players
2002 FIFA World Cup players
AS Monaco FC players
Arsenal F.C. players
Chelsea F.C. players
Chevaliers of the Légion d'honneur
Expatriate footballers in England
Expatriate footballers in Spain
FC Barcelona players
FIFA World Cup-winning players
France international footballers
French expatriate sportspeople in England
French expatriate sportspeople in Spain
French expatriate footballers
French footballers
La Liga players
Ligue 1 players
Premier League players
UEFA Euro 1992 players
UEFA Euro 2000 players
UEFA European Championship-winning players
France youth international footballers
FA Cup Final players
French expatriate sportspeople in Monaco
Footballers from Normandy